The Robin Hood Way is a waymarked long-distance footpath in the Midlands of England.

Length

Route
The Robin Hood way commemorates the famous folklore figure Robin Hood and starts from Nottingham Castle running to Edwinstowe

Its passes through Sherwood Forest taking in Clumber Park, Farnsfield, Greasley, Kimberley, Rainworth, Creswell Crags, Kirton and Bothamsall.

References

External links

Robin Hood Way website and all route details
Rambler's Association details of the walk

Long-distance footpaths in England
Footpaths in Nottinghamshire
Robin Hood
Sherwood Forest